is a Japanese voice actress. She voiced Ayu Daikuuji in Rumbling Hearts and the web series Ayumayu Gekijou. Other voice roles include Lilynette Gingerbuck in Bleach, July in Darker than Black, Ganko Morikawa in Flame of Recca, Hyun in Geneshaft, Mayuko Asano in Great Teacher Onizuka, Hanabi Hyuga in Naruto, Seiko in Saikano and Tart in Tokyo Mew Mew. Asai used several pseudonyms on each games. She is associated with D-Color.

Filmography

Anime

Films

Video games

Dubbing

Drama CD

References

External links

 Official agency profile (click 浅井清己)  at D-Color 
 Kiyomi Asai at GamePlaza Haruka Voice Acting Database 
 

1974 births
Living people
Voice actresses from Tokyo
Japanese voice actresses
Japanese video game actresses
21st-century Japanese actresses
Mausu Promotion voice actors